BYC may mean:

Backyard cricket
Balboa Yacht Club
Barrack Young Controllers FC, an association football club in Monrovia, Liberia
Balatonfüredi Yacht Club of Balatonfüred, Hungary
Base Year Compensation, a type of player in NBA, see NBA Salary Cap
Biloxi Yacht Club of Biloxi, Mississippi
Brachyspina carrier, a calf tested positive for having brachyspina syndrome (a genetic abnormality in the Holstein Friesian cattle breed); those tested negative are designated as BYF (brachyspina-free)
British Youth Council
Buccaneer Yacht Club (disambiguation), various meanings